The Little River Turnpike Bridge carries U.S. Route 50 (US 50) across the Little River near Aldie in Loudoun County, Virginia. The two-arch masonry bridge was built in 1826 by the Little River Turnpike Company, which built the roadway that is now US 50. The costs of the bridge were apparently shared between that company and the Ashley's Gap Turnpike Company. It is one of a small number of masonry arch bridges still carrying a major through road in the state.

The bridge has received only modest visible modifications since its construction. Concrete caps have been installed on upper surface elements, and the arch underside has also been protected with shotcrete.  The upstream central pier has had a concrete fender added to protect it from debris and scouring. The downstream parapet wall was damaged by a truck in 1998 and reconstructed, and in 2004 reinforcing metal rods were injected into the rubble of the bridge to help distribute the active load. , the bridge has no weight limit.

The bridge was listed on the National Register of Historic Places in 2014.

See also
 
 
 
 
 List of bridges on the National Register of Historic Places in Virginia
 National Register of Historic Places listings in Loudoun County, Virginia

References

Road bridges on the National Register of Historic Places in Virginia
Bridges completed in 1826
National Register of Historic Places in Loudoun County, Virginia
Arch bridges in the United States
U.S. Route 50
Bridges of the United States Numbered Highway System
Buildings and structures in Loudoun County, Virginia
1826 establishments in Virginia